William H. Wilson was an American Negro league shortstop in the 1880s.

Wilson played for the Pittsburgh Keystones in 1887. In seven recorded games, he posted 13 hits in 35 plate appearances.

References

External links
Baseball statistics and player information from Baseball-Reference Black Baseball Stats and Seamheads

Year of birth missing
Year of death missing
Place of birth missing
Place of death missing
Pittsburgh Keystones players
Baseball shortstops